Belinsky (masculine), Belinskaya (feminine), or Belinskoye (neuter) is the name of several inhabited localities in Russia.

Urban localities
Belinsky, Penza Oblast, a town in Belinsky District of Penza Oblast

Rural localities
Belinskoye, Kaliningrad Oblast, a settlement in Novostroyevsky Rural Okrug of Ozyorsky District in Kaliningrad Oblast
Belinskoye, Sakhalin Oblast, a selo in Tomarinsky District of Sakhalin Oblast